Alive in France is a 2017 French documentary film about American filmmaker Abel Ferrara touring and performing rock and roll with his band. The documentary was directed by Ferrara. It premiered as part of the 2017 Cannes Film Festival Directors' Fortnight.

Participants
In addition to Ferrara, the following people appeared in the documentary:

Joe Delia
Paul Hipp
Cristina Chiriac
Dounia Sichov
PJ Delia
Laurent Bechad

Production
The documentary was shot in Toulouse and Paris in October 2016.

Reception
The film has a 20% rating on Rotten Tomatoes. Wendy Ide of The Guardian awarded the film three stars out of five.

References

External links
 
 

2017 films
2017 documentary films
2010s English-language films
2010s French-language films
English-language French films
French documentary films
Films directed by Abel Ferrara
Films scored by Joe Delia
Films shot in Paris
Rockumentaries
2010s French films